The posterior branch of the obturator nerve pierces the anterior part of the obturator externus, and supplies this muscle; it then passes behind the adductor brevis on the front of the adductor magnus, where it divides into numerous muscular branches which are distributed to the adductor magnus and the adductor brevis.

It usually gives off an articular branch to the knee-joint.

Articular branch for the knee-joint
The articular branch for the knee-joint is sometimes absent; it either perforates the lower part of the adductor magnus, or passes through the opening which transmits the femoral artery, and enters the popliteal fossa; it then descends upon the popliteal artery, as far as the back part of the knee-joint, where it perforates the oblique popliteal ligament, and is distributed to the synovial membrane. It gives filaments to the popliteal artery.

References

External links
 
 

Nerves of the lower limb and lower torso